The Hollandsche Vliegtuigenfabriek Avia was a two-seat biplane, designed and displayed in the Netherlands in 1918. It was advertised as a fighter or as a post and passenger aircraft.  Its first flight has not been confirmed.

Design and development
The Avia's only known appearance was at an exhibition at Rotterdam after the Armistice in 1918, where it was described both as a fighter, carrying fixed, forward firing machine guns and a moveable gun in the rear cockpit, and as a post- and passenger carrier. It was a two bay biplane with parallel interplane struts. The upper wing was supported over the fuselage by a cabane structure. It had a fixed, single axle conventional undercarriage, with struts from each wheel to the central fuselage underside and was powered by a 134 kW (180 hp) Argus six cylinder upright inline water-cooled engine, driving a two blade propeller.

There were reports that the Avia was to be taken to Soesterberg for flight testing but nothing more was heard about it.

Specifications

References

1910s Dutch military aircraft